UYBA Volley is an Italian women's volleyball club based in Busto Arsizio, in the province of Varese. The team currently plays in the Serie A1, Italy's highest professional league. The team is sponsored by Yamamay, an Italian company that produces undergarment and swimsuits.

Previous names
Due to sponsorship, the club have competed under the following names:
 Brums Busto Arsizio (2000–2002)
 Dimeglio Brums Busto Arsizio (2002–2006)
 Yamamay Busto Arsizio (2006–2012)
 Unendo Yamamay Busto Arsizio (2012–2016)
 Unet Yamamay Busto Arsizio (2016–2017)
 Unet E-Work Busto Arsizio (2017–present)

History
In 1996, Serie A1 club Unione Sportiva Cistellum Volley was playing at the Palazzetto dello Sport in Cislago, a venue with small capacity, forcing the club to look for a new home venue. In 1997, when the nearby city of Busto Arsizio inaugurated a 4,490 seat venue named PalaYamamay-Maria Piantanida, Cistellum decided to relocate to Busto Arsizio where it remained for three seasons.

The club's first season was at the Serie A2 in 2000–01, promotion to the Serie A1 was achieved after seven seasons, in 2007. The first title was the 2009–10 Women's CEV Cup and in 2012 the club won four titles (Serie A1, Italian Cup, CEV Cup and Italian Super Cup).

Arena
The team currently plays at the PalaYamamay, an indoor arena owned by the municipality of Busto Arsizio. The town volleyball team has an exclusive right to use the arena, upon payment of a rental fee.

Supporters and rivalries
The main group of supporters of the Yamamay Busto Arsizio is called "Amici delle Farfalle" (AdF) (Friends of the butterflies).

The main rivalry is with GSO Villa Cortese, a team based in Villa Cortese, in the Province of Milan, because the two cities are neighbors and because they belong to two different provinces. The matches between the two teams are referred as "Derby dell'Altomilanese" (Derby of the Alto Milanese). The "Alto Milanese" is a geographical area between the provinces of Milan, Varese and part of the province of Como.

Team

Season 2020–2021, as of February 2021.

Current coaching staff

Honours

National competitions
  National League: 1
2011–12

  Coppa Italia: 1
2011–12

  Italian Super Cup: 1
2012

International competitions
  CEV Cup: 3
2009–10， 2011–12，2018–19

References

External links

 Official website 

Italian women's volleyball clubs
Volleyball clubs established in 2000
2000 establishments in Italy
Busto Arsizio
Sport in Lombardy
Serie A1 (women's volleyball) clubs